Pablo Joaquin Podio (born 7 August 1989) is an Argentine professional footballer who plays as a midfielder for Kyzylzhar in Kazakhstan.

Club career

ŽP Šport Podbrezová
After beginning his career with F.C. PSC La Playosa, Podio moved to Europe in 2008 to play for ŽP Šport Podbrezová as part of the Inter Campus project. He played there until 2017.
He made his Fortuna Liga debut for Podbrezová against Slovan Bratislava on 11 July 2014. He had debuted in the starting-XI and was booked with a late yellow card. Podbrezová had lost at Pasienky 2:1 after two goals by Marko Milinković.

Keşla (loan)
On 17 January 2018, Keşla announced the signing of Podio on a six-month contract.

Irtysh Pavlodar
On 11 January 2020, Irtysh Pavlodar announced the signing of Podio.

Personal life
He also possess Slovak citizenship.

References

External links
 
 FO ŽP Šport Podbrezová profile
 Eurofotbal profile

1989 births
Living people
Slovak footballers
Naturalized citizens of Slovakia
Association football midfielders
FK Železiarne Podbrezová players
FC Fastav Zlín players
Shamakhi FK players
FC Irtysh Pavlodar players
FC Kyzylzhar players
Slovak Super Liga players
Czech First League players
Azerbaijan Premier League players
Kazakhstan Premier League players
Argentine expatriate sportspeople in Slovakia
Expatriate footballers in Slovakia
Argentine expatriate sportspeople in the Czech Republic
Expatriate footballers in the Czech Republic
Argentine expatriate sportspeople in Azerbaijan
Expatriate footballers in Azerbaijan
Argentine expatriate sportspeople in Kazakhstan
Expatriate footballers in Kazakhstan
Argentine expatriate footballers
Argentine footballers
Footballers from Córdoba, Argentina
Naturalised association football players